Katie Henke (born October 30, 1980) is an American politician who served in the Oklahoma House of Representatives from the 71st district from 2012 to 2018.

References

1980 births
Living people
Republican Party members of the Oklahoma House of Representatives